Charles M. Ginsburg (born 1943) was born in Omaha, Nebraska.  Ginsburg is  the Marilyn R. Corrigan Distinguished Chair of Pediatric Research, Professor of Pediatrics and the Senior Associate Dean for Academic Administration at UT Southwestern Medical Center in Dallas. Prior to assuming his current position, Dr. Ginsburg was Chairman of the Department of Pediatrics at UT Southwestern and Chief of Staff of Children’s Medical Center, positions that he held for 15 years. He served as Interim Dean of UT Southwestern in 2009-2010. Dr. Ginsburg has authored over 150 publications and is a nationally respected clinical investigator who primarily focused his interests in infant and childhood infectious diseases.

Publications
Pediatric Primer. Charles M. Ginsburg. Product Group: Book Publisher: The Summit Publishing Group (25 September 1996) 
Pediatric Therapy. Heinz F. Eichenwald, Josef Stroder, Charles M. Ginsburg.

References

External links
 http://health.usnews.com/top-doctors/charles-ginsburg-pediatrician-80CC004980
 http://directory.dmagazine.com
 www.utsouthwestern.edu

1943 births
Living people
People from Omaha, Nebraska
American pediatricians